The 1912 Saint Louis Billikens football team was an American football team that represented Saint Louis University during the 1912 college football season. In their second season under head coach Frank Dennie, the Billikens compiled a 7–2 record and outscored opponents by a total of 201 to 80. The team played its home games at Sportsman's Park at St. Louis.

Schedule

References

Saint Louis
Saint Louis Billikens football seasons
Saint Louis Billikens football